Babar is a male given name of Persian origin and may refer to:

Places
 Babar District, Khenchela Province, Algeria
 Babar, Algeria, a municipality in Babar District
 Babur, Iran (disambiguation)
 Babar Pur, a census town in Delhi, India
 Babar Islands, Maluku Province, Indonesia
 Babar Kot, an Indus Valley archeological site in the Saurashtra region of Gujarat, India

Other uses
 Babar the Elephant, a character in Jean de Brunhoff's series of children's books, and the films and television shows based on them
 Babar (TV series), a Canadian/French animated fantasy television series
 Babar and the Adventures of Badou, a 2010 animated series
 BaBar experiment, an international collaboration of physicists and engineers
 Babar languages, a group of Timor languages spoken on the Babar Islands

See also
 Babbar (disambiguation)
 Babor (disambiguation)
 Babr, a genus of amphipod crustaceans in the family Pallaseidae
 Babur (disambiguation)